Aleksandr Aleksandrovich Arkhangelsky (1892 – 18 december 1978) was a Soviet and Russian aircraft designer and doctor of technical sciences. Hero of Socialist Labour (1947)

Biography
Arkhangelsky was born in 1892, and graduated from MVTU in 1918. During his studies, he worked at the aerodynamic laboratory headed by Nikolay Zhukovsky, then worked at TsAGI from 1918–1936.

He designed and built several aerosleds ARBES along with B. S. Stechkin. After the establishment of the aircraft design bureau of Andrei Tupolev at TsAGI, he participated in all ANT designs.

In 1932, he was appointed chief of the department of high-speed aircraft. He was the leading designer of the first Soviet bomber, the ANT-40 (SB), and its transport development, the PS-35. From 1936 on, he was chief of the bureau and responsible for large-scale production of the SB. He was the chief designer of the Ar-2.

Arhangelsky OKB rejoined Tupolev OKB in 1941. In 1947, he became first deputy chief designer.

He was the uncle of mathematician Alexander Arhangelskii.

He died in 1978.

References
https://web.archive.org/web/20050221050008/http://www.aviation.ru/okb.php

1892 births
1978 deaths
Bauman Moscow State Technical University alumni
Central Aerohydrodynamic Institute employees
Heroes of Socialist Labour
Stalin Prize winners
Lenin Prize winners
Recipients of the Order of Lenin
Recipients of the Order of the Red Banner of Labour
Recipients of the Order of the Red Star
Russian aerospace engineers
Soviet aerospace engineers
Soviet inventors

Soviet mechanical engineers
Burials at Novodevichy Cemetery